Isidoro Joamir Hinestroza Hernández (born 11 September 1997) is a Panamanian footballer who plays as a forward for U.D. Vilafranquense in LigaPro.

Career

Vilafranquense
In July 2019, Hinestroza moved to Portuguese club Vilafranquense. He made his league debut for the club on 14 September 2019, coming on as an 83rd minute substitute for Filipe Oliveira in a 3–0 away defeat to Farense.

References

External links

1997 births
Living people
Panamanian footballers
San Francisco F.C. players
Unión Deportivo Universitario players
Liga Panameña de Fútbol players
Liga Portugal 2 players
Panama under-20 international footballers
Association football forwards
Panamanian expatriate footballers
Expatriate footballers in Portugal
Panamanian expatriate sportspeople in Portugal